Obalufon Alayemore (Yoruba: Ọbalùfọ̀n Aláyémọrẹ), also refernced as Ọbalùfọ̀n II, was an Ooni of Ife, a paramount traditional ruler of Ile Ife, the ancestral home of the Yorubas. He succeeded his father  Obalufon Ogbogbodirin. Obalufon Alayemore was forced out of power by Ooni Oranmiyan and later returned with the help of local residents to reclaim the throne.

 Ọbalùfọ̀n II established kingdoms across the Yoruba land and Benin including in cities and towns like Ido-Ogun, Ilara. After returning to power, he became  the first and only Ooni to be crowned twice. He is described as the grand patron of art as the Yoruba art tradition reached its peak during his reign. These arts are dated to around 1300 CE based on radiocarbon and thermoluminescence analysis. He is identified today as the patron not only as the patron deity of bronze casting arts and textiles but also as the deity of good governance and the founder of Ogboni, the association identified with both the selection of rulers and with maintaining safe roads for commerce. One of the most famous art works with which he is identified as patron is the pure copper mask shown here and known as the Obalufon mask. It was long stored in the palace in the room identified with coronations and is believed to have served a role in those rites. Obalufon II was married to the famous Ife Queen, Moremi, who also is believed to have played a role in his return to power. Among the most famous of his more recent successors is the Oba (King) Aderemi-Adeniyi Adedapo, the Olojudo of Ido-Osun, who has also served as head of the Nigerian Rugby federation and more recently as Secretary General, Council of Yoruba Obas.

References

Oonis of Ife
Yoruba history
Nigerian city founders